Old Boys' Association Football Club is a junior and senior football club based in the southern New Zealand city of Invercargill.

Old Boys' was founded in 1959 by a small group of Southland Boys High School old boys – hence the name Old Boys'. In 1960 the old Brigadiers AFC clubrooms were purchased at Waverley Park. The current clubrooms were built by volunteer labour and were completed in 1979.

Old Boys' is a regular entrant to the Chatham Cup, recording its best season in 2009, when it reached the last 32 stage of the competition. It currently plays in the Donald Gray division, the premiere men's football grade in Southland. The team has won the Southland Region's Donald Gray Memorial Cup on six occasions.

Old Boys won promotion to the FootballSouth Premier League for the 2013 season. They were the only Invercargill side in the league since Southland Spirit FC pulled out at the end of 2011. A 9th-place finish saw the side relegated from the competition.

With close to 300 registered junior and senior players Old Boys' has become the largest football club in Southland.

From modest beginnings the club has risen to be Southland's most progressive club.

Notable players
Bill Chapman (Invercargill HSOB)
Les Groves (Invercargill HSOB)

References
Club website
FootballSouth Old Boys' page

Association football clubs established in 1959
1959 establishments in New Zealand
Association football clubs in Invercargill